John Cooney (born in 1986 or 1987), also known by his pseudonym jmtb02, is a prolific Sacramento-based game developer best known for his numerous Flash games, many which feature a blue elephant as the player avatar, especially his metagame send-ups such as Achievement Unlocked and This is the Only Level. He is currently the chief executive officer of Armor Games.

Life and career
Cooney got into development of Flash games during high school. While enrolled at University of California, Davis, Cooney kept developing games and founded his own game development company, JMTB02 Studios. The money he earned through his games were enough to pay for his college tuition. In 2007, Cooney joined Armor Games as their first employee. in 2012, he joined Kongregate, where he stayed until rejoining Armor Games in 2019 as the vice-president of business development of Armor Games Studios. In 2021, Cooney became the CEO of Armor Games.

Games
 Achievement Unlocked (2008)
 Achievement Unlocked 2
 Achievement Unlocked 3
 AngleBeat
 Argent Burst
 Ball Revamped
 Ball Revamped 2 Metaphysik
 Ball Revamped 3 Andromeda
 Ball Revamped 3 Gemini
 Ball Revamped 4 Amplitude
 Ball Revamped 5 Synergy
 Balloon in a Wasteland
 Chuck the Sheep
 Coinbox Hero
 Color Keys
 Compulse
 Console Launch: Second Shipment
 Cooper's Little Adventure
 Corporation Inc.
 Dark Cut
 Dark Cut 2
 Dark Cut 3
 Elements
 Elephant Quest
 Elephant Rave
 Ellipsis
 Epic Combo!
 Epic Combo Redux
 Exit Path
 Exit Path 2
 Extreme Missile Defense X-treme 3D
 Five Til
 Flock Together
 Four Second Firestorm
 Four Second Frenzy
 Four Second Fury
 Fox Fyre
 Frontier
 Giraffe Attack
 Give Up
 Grid16
 Hedgehog Launch 2
 I Hate Traffic
 I Love Traffic
 Knights of Rock
 Light Cut
 Llama Adventure
 LOOT The Game
 Luminara
 Maverick
 Medieval Golf
 Mr. Walter's Grand Excursion
 Obey The Game
 Obsessive Compulse Tournament
 Ocean Explorer
 Parachute Retro
 Parachute Retrospect
 Pocket Change
 Rabbit Wants Cake
 RedEye 1031
 Run Elephant Run
 Run Right
 Scribble
 Scribble 2
 Scribble States
 Sixty
 Soviet Rocket Giraffe Go Go Go!
 Spectrum Genesis
 Spin Doctor
 Squeezed
 Super Mafia Land
 TBA
 TBA Two
 The Next Floor
 This is the Only Level (2009)
 This is the Only Level Too
 This is the Only Level 3
 Timemu
 Treadmillasaurus Rex
 TwoThree
 Warp Shot

References

Browser game developers
Video game developers
1980s births
Living people
American computer businesspeople
American chief executives